Compagnie Aérienne Corse Méditerranée S.A.E.M., trading as Air Corsica (formerly CCM Airlines), is the flag carrier of the French insular region of Corsica, with its head office on the grounds of Ajaccio Napoléon Bonaparte Airport in Ajaccio, Corsica. It operates passenger services from Corsica to continental France. Its main base is Ajaccio Napoleon Bonaparte Airport, with hubs at Figari–Sud Corse Airport, Bastia – Poretta Airport and Calvi – Sainte-Catherine Airport.

History 
Air Corsica operates certain flights as a franchise for Air France and ITA Airways. Air Corsica outsources its passenger service system, which manages reservations, inventory and pricing to Amadeus using the Altéa system.

Destinations

Codeshare agreements
Air Corsica has codeshare agreements with the following airlines:

 Air France
 Air France Hop
 ITA Airways

Fleet

Current fleet
, Air Corsica's fleet consists of the following aircraft:

Former fleet
The airline previously operated the following aircraft (as of February 2023):
 F-GRPZ, ATR72-500
 F-GRPY, ATR72-500
 F-HDGK, A320-216
 F-HZFM, A320-216

References

External links

Official website 
Official website  (Archive)

Airlines of France
Airlines established in 2000
French companies established in 2000
Transport in Corsica
Air France–KLM